Colbordolo is a frazione of the comune of Vallefoglia in the Province of Pesaro e Urbino in the Italian region Marche. It was a separate comune until 2013.

References

Cities and towns in the Marche